Chrotoma is a genus of long-horned beetles in the family Cerambycidae. There is a single species in Chrotoma, C. dunniana, found in the southwest United States and northern Mexico.

References

Bothriospilini
Taxa described in 1891
Beetle genera
Taxa named by Thomas Lincoln Casey Jr.